Pokémon: Diamond and Pearl: Battle Dimension (advertised as Pokémon: DP Battle Dimension) is the eleventh season of the Pokémon animated series and the second season of Pokémon the Series: Diamond and Pearl, known in Japan as . It originally aired in Japan from November 8, 2007, to December 4, 2008, on TV Tokyo, and in the United States from April 12, 2008, to May 2, 2009, on Cartoon Network, covering the continuing adventures of series protagonist Ash Ketchum as he continues to travel Sinnoh with Dawn, Pikachu, and Brock.

The Japanese opening songs are "Together" for 26 episodes, and "Together 2008" for 17 episodes by Fumie Akiyoshi, and "High Touch!" (ハイタッチ!, Hai Tatchi!) by Satoshi / Ash Ketchum (Rika Matsumoto) and Hikari / Dawn (Megumi Toyoguchi) for 9 episodes. The ending songs are "By Your Side 〜Hikari's Theme〜 (Winter. Version)" (君のそばで 〜ヒカリのテーマ〜 Winter. Version, Kimi no Soba de 〜Hikari no Tēma〜 Winter. Version) by Grin for 9 episodes, "Message of the Wind" (風のメッセージ, Kaze no Messēji) for 23 episodes, and "Message of the Wind (POKAPOKA-VERSION.)" (風にメッセージ POKAPOKA-VERSION., Kaze no Messēji POKAPOKA-VERSION.) for 11 episodes by Mai Mizuhashi, "Surely Tomorrow" (あしたはきっと, Ashita wa Kitto) by Kanako Yoshii for 9 episodes, and the English opening song is "We Will Be Heroes" by Kirsten Price. Its instrumental version served as the end credit song.

Beginning with this season all the way up to the twenty second DuArt Media Services would serve as TPCi's producing partner for the English dub taking over from TAJ Productions.



Episode list

Music 
The Japanese opening songs are "Together" for 26 episodes, and "Together 2008" for 17 episodes by Fumie Akiyoshi, and "High Touch!" (ハイタッチ!, Hai Tatchi!) by Rika Matsumoto and Megumi Toyoguchi for 9 episodes. The ending songs are "By Your Side 〜Hikari's Theme〜 (Winter. Version)" (君のそばで 〜ヒカリのテーマ〜 Winter. Version, Kimi no Soba de 〜Hikari no Tēma〜 Winter. Version) by Grin for 9 episodes, "Message of the Wind" (風のメッセージ, Kaze no Messēji) for 23 episodes, and "Message of the Wind (POKAPOKA-VERSION.)" (風にメッセージ POKAPOKA-VERSION., Kaze no Messēji POKAPOKA-VERSION.) for 11 episodes by Mai Mizuhashi, "Surely Tomorrow" (あしたはきっと, Ashita wa Kitto) by Kanako Yoshii for 9 episodes, and the English opening song is "We Will Be Heroes" by Kirsten Price. Its instrumental version served as the end credit song.

Home media releases
The series was released on six volume DVDs by Viz Media and Warner Home Video in the United States, which were released separately and as part of two boxsets. This was the first Pokémon DVD released in the United States after Viz's new home video partnership with Warner.

Viz Media and Warner Home Video released Pokémon the Series Diamond and Pearl: Battle Dimension – The Complete Season on DVD on January 7, 2020.

References

External links 
 
  at TV Tokyo 
  at TV Tokyo 
  at Pokémon JP official website 

2007 Japanese television seasons
2008 Japanese television seasons
Season11